Mar John Panamthottathil (born 31 May 1966) is an Indian-born bishop of the Syro-Malabar Catholic Church in the Australia and Oceania. He is currently the eparch-elect of the Syro-Malabar Catholic Eparchy of Melbourne.

Biography

Early Life and Ministry in India 
John Panamthottahil was born in Peravoor, Kearla and entered the Carmelites of Mary Immaculate Syro Malabar Institute of Pontifical Right in Kozhikode where he gave his solemn profession. On 26 December 1997, He was ordained a priest by Archeparch George Valiamattam into the Archeparchy of Tellicherry. He continued his studies at Dharamaram College for Philosophy and Theology along with a Master of Arts in English Lierature at Devagiri College (Kozhikode) and a Master in Education at St. Joseph's College, Mannananm. He also was a parochial priest, educator, and provincial superior in Thamarassery. He speaks Malayalam, English, and Hindi

Ministry in America and Australia 
Mar John later moved to the United States to serve in the Latin Roman Catholic Diocese of Nashville before in 2015, When he moved to Australia to serve in the Latin Roman Catholic Archdiocese of Brisbane until 2020. In Brisbane, He served at an assistant pastor at Cathedral of St Stephen and Saint Bernardine Church, Regents Park and then served at Our Lady and Saint Dympna's Church, Aspley as its parochial pastor. While his time serving Latin Congregations, he also served the Syro Malabar community in Australia.

Return to Ministry in India 
In 2020, He returned to India where he joined the Syro-Malabar Catholic Eparchy of Mananthavady and served as the parish priest of Saint Elias Church, Nirvilpuzha until his appointment as bishop. He also served as an English Educator at the Bendictine Ashram, Makkiyad.

Eparch-elect 
On 14 January 2023, Major Archbishop Mar George Alencherry announced the appointment of Mar John Panamthottahil as the 2nd Eparch of Melbourne after Pope Francis accepted Bishop-Emeritus Mar Bosco Puthur's resignation after he reached the age of 75. Puthur, Alencherry, and Panamthottahil hosted a press conference announcing the appointment after the January meeting of the Synod of Bishops.

References

Indian Catholic bishops
Syro-Malabar bishops
Eastern Catholicism
1966 births
Living people